This is the discography of American singer Bobby Darin. It lists Darin's original singles, LPs, and compilations from his career.  Darin recorded his first single, "Rock Island Line"/"Timber", on the Decca label in 1956, and released his eponymous debut album two years later in 1958. The majority of the singer's recordings were released on Atco/Atlantic Records and later on Capitol Records. Darin had many hit singles during his lifetime and three went to No. 1 on various charts – "Splish Splash", "Dream Lover" and "Mack the Knife".

Albums

Studio albums

Live albums

Compilation albums

Unreleased albums

Singles

References

Discographies of American artists
Discography